Fort Langley Water Aerodrome  is located adjacent to Fort Langley, British Columbia, Canada.

See also
Fort Langley Airport

References

Seaplane bases in British Columbia
Transport in Langley, British Columbia (district municipality)
Registered aerodromes in British Columbia